The Laboratoire de mécanique de Lille (LML) is a French research laboratory (UMR CNRS 8107) part of the Carnot institute ARTS. More than 200 people work in this laboratory which was created in 1985.

It supports academic activities in the following graduate schools :
 Arts et Métiers ParisTech (ENSAM)
 École centrale de Lille
 University of Lille.

It supports doctoral researches and hosts PhD doctoral candidates in relationship with the European Doctoral College Lille Nord de France.

Research area

With more than two hundreds researchers, LML focuses on the following research area :
 Mechanical reliability and Tribology ; applications on brakes
 Fluid mechanics ; Turbulence ; Turbo machines
 Civil engineering ; Soil mechanics

Equipment and facilities

The laboratory has heavy investigation equipment in its 3 research areas. These machines include a 20 meters long wind tunnel to study fluid mechanics, a multi-axis tensile test machine, to study mechanical behavior of complex materials and a micro-scale fatigue machine to study material life cycle.

Computations run thanks to a calculation cluster (HPC) composed of 288 cores.

Former members of the Laboratoire de mécanique de Lille
 Joseph Valentin Boussinesq, professor at COMUE Lille Nord de France and at Institut industriel du Nord, known for Boussinesq approximation (water waves) in Fluid mechanics
 Joseph Kampé de Fériet, professor at COMUE Lille Nord de France and founder of the Institut de mécanique des fluides de Lille (ONERA Lille)

External links
 LML site
 Institut CARNOT ARTS
 Joseph Boussinesq (1842-1929), Cours d'analyse infinitésimale

Laboratories of Arts et Métiers ParisTech
Laboratories in France
French National Centre for Scientific Research
University of Lille Nord de France
1989 establishments in France